The Grand Prix de la Libération was an annual road cycling race in the Netherlands that took place in the form of a team time trial from 1988 until 1991. It was on the calendar of the UCI Road World Cup for all three editions.

Winners

References

UCI Road World Cup races
Cycle races in the Netherlands
Recurring sporting events established in 1988
1988 establishments in the Netherlands
Recurring sporting events disestablished in 1991
Defunct cycling races in the Netherlands
1991 disestablishments in the Netherlands
Cycling in Eindhoven